North Fitzroy tram depot was a depot on the Melbourne tram network. Located on Nicholson Street, North Fitzroy, it opened in 1956 when the Melbourne & Metropolitan Tramways Board converted part of its North Fitzroy bus depot for tramway operation when the Bourke Street to Brunswick East line reopened. In 1976 it became a sub-unit of East Preston depot. It was the smallest tram depot in Melbourne.

With the impending takeover of the Public Transport Corporation's bus services from the depot by the National Bus Company, it closed on 18 December 1993 with the remaining 10 trams that operated on route 96 reallocated to South Melbourne.

It briefly reopened in 2008/09 to stable W class trams used on the City Circle while Southbank depot was undergoing refurbishment. In 2020 the tracks leading to the depot were disconnected during works along Nicholson Street.

Immediately to the south is a Public Transport Victoria bus depot, operated since 2022 by Kinetic Melbourne.

References

Tram depots in Melbourne
Transport infrastructure completed in 1956
1956 establishments in Australia
1993 disestablishments in Australia
Fitzroy, Victoria